Lisieux Matriculation Higher Secondary School is an all boys high school in Coimbatore, Tamil Nadu, India, founded in 1972 by Carmelites of Mary Immaculate of the Preshitha Province and owned by the Little Flower Education Society. It is a boys-only school with ISO 9001:2008 certification. The school provides education for students from Junior KG - Grade 12.

Sports

The school provides coaching for basketball, volleyball, badminton, skating, chess, table tennis, carrom and conducts inter-school competitions in those sports. The school conducts a major interschool basketball competition every year with the name 'St. Kuriakose Elias Chavara South Indian Interschool Basketball Tournament'. It was inaugurated by F1 racer Narain Karthikeyan. Students from Tamil Nadu, Karnataka and Kerala participate in this tournament.

Robotics 
The school provides basic robotics classes to the High School students. The students are taught basics of programming using scratch, Arduino IDE. They are introduced to simulation platforms such as TinkerCAD, Fritzing etc.,

List of events celebrated in school
Investiture ceremony
Inauguration of clubs
Children's day
Teachers day
Onam celebration
Sports day
Culfest
St.Kuriakose elias Chavara south Indian interschool basketball tournament
Founder's day
Manager's Day
Scientia-An intra-school science fair.
Christmas celebration
 New year and Pongal celebration
Annual day

Principals
 Rev. Fr. George Hadrian - 1972-77
 Rev. Fr. Edward -1977-79,(taught Physics at the school in 1977)
 Rev. Fr. Thomas Prakash - 1979-80	
 Rev. Fr. Zachaeus - 1980-83
 Rev. Fr. Francis Thaivalappil - 1983-93
 Rev. Fr. Panthan Anickal George Martiadoss - 1993-99
 Rev. Fr. Elinjickal Xavier - 1999-08
 Rev. Fr. Manjaly Varghese - 2008-11
 Rev. Fr. Dr. Philips Pontheckan - 2011–2020
Rev.Fr.Dr.Paul Thekkiniyath - 2020 - *

Notable alumni
Actor Siddharth Venugopal
Director Karthick Naren - Director of Dhuruvangal Pathinaaru

Gallery

References

External links

 

Carmelite educational institutions
Catholic secondary schools in India
Boys' schools in India
Christian schools in Tamil Nadu
Primary schools in Tamil Nadu
High schools and secondary schools in Tamil Nadu
Schools in Coimbatore
Educational institutions established in 1972
1972 establishments in Tamil Nadu